Hadi Yahya is a Saudi Arabian footballer who currently plays as a defender for Qilwah.

References

External links 
 

Living people
1990 births
Saudi Arabian footballers
Al-Shabab FC (Riyadh) players
Al-Raed FC players
Al-Faisaly FC players
Al-Najma SC players
Al-Kholood Club players
Wej SC players
Qilwah FC players
Saudi Professional League players
Saudi Second Division players
Association football defenders